NXT TakeOver: New York was the 24th NXT TakeOver professional wrestling livestreaming event produced by WWE. It was held exclusively for wrestlers from the promotion's NXT brand division. The event aired exclusively on the WWE Network and took place on April 5, 2019, at the Barclays Center in Brooklyn, New York as part of the WrestleMania 35 weekend festivities.

Five matches were contested at the event. In the main event, Johnny Gargano defeated Adam Cole in a two out of three falls match to win the vacant NXT Championship. Other matches on the undercard saw Walter defeat Pete Dunne to win the WWE United Kingdom Championship (also ending Dunne's record-setting reign at 685 days), Shayna Baszler retaining the NXT Women's Championship in a fatal four-way match, Velveteen Dream ending Matt Riddle's undefeated streak and retaining the NXT North American Championship, and The War Raiders (Hanson and Rowe) retaining the NXT Tag Team Championship against Dusty Rhodes Tag Team Classic winners Aleister Black and Ricochet in the opening bout.

Production

Background
TakeOver was a series of professional wrestling shows that began in May 2014, as WWE's then-developmental league NXT held their second WWE Network-exclusive event, billed as TakeOver. In subsequent months, the "TakeOver" moniker became the brand used by WWE for all of their NXT live specials. In March 2018, it was announced that WrestleMania 35 would be held at the MetLife Stadium in East Rutherford, New Jersey, with the event's associated NXT TakeOver being held at the Barclays Center in Brooklyn, New York on April 5, 2019. The event was in turn titled TakeOver: New York. It was the 24th NXT TakeOver event and was the first TakeOver named after the U.S. state instead of the host city.

NXT previously held a recurring subseries of TakeOvers titled TakeOver: Brooklyn, which were each held at the Barclays Center and were a support show for WWE's annual SummerSlam pay-per-view in August. Although TakeOver: New York was held at this same venue, it did not continue the TakeOver: Brooklyn name. It was also held in April as a support show for WrestleMania.

Storylines 
The card included matches that resulted from scripted storylines, where wrestlers portrayed heroes, villains, or less distinguishable characters in scripted events that built tension and culminated in a wrestling match or series of matches. Results were predetermined by WWE's writers on the NXT brand, while storylines were produced on their weekly television program, NXT.

In the fourth annual Dusty Rhodes Tag Team Classic, Aleister Black and Ricochet advanced to the finals and defeated The Forgotten Sons (Steve Cutler and Wesley Blake) to win the tournament. This also earned them an NXT Tag Team Championship match against the War Raiders (Hanson and Rowe) at TakeOver.

In the Classic, Johnny Gargano decided to team up once again with former friend and bitter rival, NXT Champion Tommaso Ciampa, reforming #DIY. After losing to Black and Ricochet in the semifinals, Ciampa was about to turn on Gargano again, but Gargano was prepared and turned the attack around. On the March 20 episode of NXT, Triple H revealed that Gargano was supposed to face Ciampa at TakeOver for the NXT title, but those plans halted due to the real life situation of Ciampa needing neck surgery, thus forcing him to vacate the title. Triple H then stated Gargano would still be in the match, and The Undisputed Era's Adam Cole won a fatal five-way against Velveteen Dream, Matt Riddle, Aleister Black, and Ricochet to fight for the vacant title. Triple H also announced that, in order to get a definitive winner, the match would be a two out of three falls match.

After winning the Worlds Collide tournament during Royal Rumble Axxess for a championship match of his choosing, Velveteen Dream defeated Johnny Gargano for the NXT North American Championship. Over the next few weeks, Dream had run-ins with Matt Riddle, who fantasized about what the championship would look like around his waist. After weeks of head games, it was eventually announced that Dream would defend the title against Riddle at TakeOver.

At TakeOver: Phoenix, Shayna Baszler retained the NXT Women's Championship against Bianca Belair by technical submission. During the match, Belair also had to deal with outside interference from Baszler's friends, former UFC Horsewomen Jessamyn Duke and Marina Shafir. This led to a match with Belair teaming with Io Shirai and Kairi Sane against the three women, and resulted in Shirai pinning Baszler. Belair, however, was not pleased as she wanted the pin and another shot at Baszler's title. During a match for a title shot at TakeOver, both Shirai and Belair were attacked by Baszler, who also choked out an assisting Sane. As she was leaving the building, Baszler was informed that, due to her actions, she would be defending her title against Belair, Shirai, and Sane in a fatal four-way match.

Event

Preliminary matches
In the opening match, The War Raiders (Hanson and Rowe) defended the NXT Tag Team Championship against Aleister Black and Ricochet. Hanson and Rowe performed Fallout on Ricochet to retain the titles.

Next, The Velveteen Dream defended the NXT North American Championship against Matt Riddle. Dream pinned Riddle with a roll up to retain the title.

After that, Pete Dunne defended the WWE United Kingdom Championship against Walter. Walter performed a Diving Splash on Dunne to win the title; this ended Dunne's record title reign at 685 days.

In the penultimate match, Shayna Baszler defended the NXT Women's Championship against Kairi Sane, Bianca Belair and Io Shirai. After Belair performed a double Kiss of Death on Shirai and Sane, Baszler applied the Kirifuda clutch on Belair, who submitted, to retain the title.

Main event 
In the main event, Johnny Gargano and Adam Cole competed in a two out of three falls match for the vacant NXT Championship. Cole performed a Last Shot on Gargano to win the first fall. Cole performed a second Last Shot on Gargano for a nearfall. Gargano forced Cole to submit to the Garga-No-Escape to win the second fall. Gargano performed a Slingshot DDT on Cole for a nearfall. Cole performed a Panama Sunrise on Gargano for a nearfall. Cole performed a Fairytale Ending on an announce table on Gargano. Back in the ring, Cole performed a Superkick on Gargano for a nearfall. Gargano applied the Garga-No-Escape but The Undisputed Era (Bobby Fish, Kyle O'Reilly and Roderick Strong) appeared. O'Reilly attacked Gargano with an eye rake and Cole pushed Gargano into the referee. Fish and O'Reilly performed Total Elimination on Gargano and Cole scored a nearfall. Gargano performed a Back Body Drop onto Fish, O'Reilly and Strong on Cole and threw Strong into the ring post. Gargano performed a Superkick on Fish and a Tornado DDT off the ring apron on O'Reilly. Cole performed a third Last Shot on Gargano for a nearfall. In the closing moments, Cole attempted another Last Shot, but Gargano avoided it and applied the Garga-No-Escape. Cole tried to make it to the bottom rope, but Gargano brought him to the middle of the ring and forced him to submit to win the third fall and the title.

After the match, Candice LeRae, Gargano's wife, appeared to celebrate with Gargano. Tommaso Ciampa, the former NXT Champion, appeared and congratulated Gargano. Gargano celebrated with LeRae and Ciampa as the event ended.

Reception
The event received widespread acclaim. Jake St-Pierre of 411Mania rated the event a perfect 10/10 rating. He described it by saying, "It's getting to the point where I don't know which TakeOver event stands out the most, but I'll be damned if New York didn't throw its hat in the ring with authority."

Dave Meltzer of the Wrestling Observer Newsletter awarded, out of five stars, 4.5 stars for both the NXT Tag Team Championship and the North American Championship matches, 4.75 stars to the Walter-Dunne match, 3.75 stars to the Women's Championship match (the only match of the event below four stars), and 5.5 stars to the Gargano-Cole match, making it the first WWE match to break the five-star rating system. To date, the Gargano-Cole match is the highest-rated WWE match by Meltzer.

The Gargano-Cole match would later win the NXT Year-End Award for Match of the Year.

Aftermath
On the April 17 episode of NXT, Johnny Gargano talked about his NXT Championship win, but Adam Cole (along with Bobby Fish and Kyle O'Reilly) called him the "uncrowned champion" of NXT, since Cole won the first fall at TakeOver: New York. Gargano then mocked Cole's "bay bay" catchphrase. Afterwards, Strong attacked Gargano from behind, and Cole, Fish, and O'Reilly joined the beatdown. The following week, Gargano defeated Strong due to an untimely assist by Cole. On the May 15 episode, a singles match between Cole and Gargano for the NXT Championship was made official for NXT TakeOver: XXV.

The rivalry between Kairi Sane and NXT Women's Champion Shayna Baszler ended on the April 17 episode of NXT, where they battled for the title under the stipulation that Sane could no longer challenge for the title if she loses. Throughout the match, Baszler focused on injuring Sane's arm. In the end, Io Shirai shoved Baszler, who won via disqualification to retain the title. Afterwards, Baszler's Horsewomen stablemates, Jessamyn Duke and Marina Shafir, dragged Shirai out of the ring and forced her to watch as Baszler stomped on Sane's injured arm. This would be Sane's final NXT appearance, as she was drafted to SmackDown during the 2019 WWE Superstar Shake-up. After several more weeks of feuding, a match between Shirai and Baszler for the NXT Women's Championship would later be scheduled for NXT TakeOver: XXV.

Results

Dusty Rhodes Tag Team Classic bracket

References

External links
 

2019 WWE Network events
New York
Events in Brooklyn, New York
Professional wrestling in New York City
April 2019 events in the United States
2019 in New York City